Loews Hotels is an American luxury hospitality company that owns or operates 26 hotels in the United States and Canada. Loews' hotels and resorts are located in major North American city centers and resort destinations.

Headquartered in New York City, Loews Hotels is a wholly owned subsidiary of Loews Corporation. Jonathan Tisch is the current chairman of Loews Hotels. Alex Tisch, the company's former president, will be Loews' new CEO effective January 1, 2023.

The company currently owns and/or operates 25 hotels and resorts in the United States and Canada, including New York City, Chicago, Philadelphia, Los Angeles, Orlando, San Diego, and Nashville.

Good Neighbor Policy
In 1990, CEO Jonathan Tisch created the "Good Neighbor Policy," which works with local organizations and schools, as well as umbrella organizations like DonorsChoose. Left over food and hotel furniture and dry goods are donated to local communities. The Good Neighbor Policy was awarded a 1996 President's Volunteer Service Award.

Properties

United States
 Loews Ventana Canyon Resort, Tucson, Arizona
 Loews Coronado Bay Resort, Coronado, California
 Loews Hollywood Hotel, Hollywood, California
formerly, Hollywood Holiday Inn
 Loews Santa Monica Beach Hotel, Santa Monica, California
 Loews Coral Gables Hotel, Coral Gables, Florida 
 Loews Miami Beach Hotel, Miami Beach, Florida
 Loews Portofino Bay at Universal Orlando Resort, Orlando, Florida
 Hard Rock Hotel at Universal Resort, Orlando, Florida
 Loews Royal Pacific Resort at Universal Orlando, Orlando, Florida
 Loews Sapphire Falls Resort at Universal Orlando, Orlando, Florida
 Universal's Cabana Bay Beach Resort at Universal Orlando, Orlando, Florida
 Universal's Aventura Hotel at Universal Orlando, Orlando, Florida
 Universal's Endless Summer Resort - Surfside Inn and Suites, Orlando, Florida
 Universal's Endless Summer Resort - Dockside Inn and Suites, Orlando, Florida
 Loews Atlanta Hotel, Atlanta, Georgia
 Loews Chicago Hotel, Chicago, Illinois
 Loews Chicago O'Hare, Rosemont, Illinois
 Loews New Orleans Hotel, New Orleans, Louisiana
 Loews Minneapolis Hotel, Minneapolis, Minnesota
 Loews Kansas City Hotel, Kansas City, Missouri
 Live! by Loews, St. Louis, Missouri
 Loews Philadelphia Hotel, Philadelphia, Pennsylvania
 Loews Regency New York, New York, New York
 Loews Vanderbilt Hotel, Nashville, Tennessee
 Live! by Loews, Arlington, Texas

Canada
 Bisha Hotel, Toronto, Ontario

Future properties
 Loews Arlington Hotel and Convention Center (2024)

Former properties

United States
 Loews Paradise Valley Resort, Scottsdale, Arizona - now DoubleTree Resort by Hilton Hotel Paradise Valley - Scottsdale
 Hotel Mark Hopkins, San Francisco, California
 Loews Regency San Francisco, San Francisco, California, 2015-2019 - now Four Seasons Hotel San Francisco at Embarcadero
 Loews Giorgio Hotel (later Loews Denver Hotel), Glendale, Colorado, 1989-2013 - now Hyatt Place Denver/Cherry Creek
 The Madison, A Loews Hotel (later Loews Madison Hotel), Washington, D.C., 2006-2011 and 2013-2017 - now The Madison Washington DC, a Hilton Hotel
 Loews L'Enfant Plaza Hotel, Washington, D.C., 1973-2013, now Hilton Washington DC National Mall The Wharf
 Americana of Bal Harbour, Bal Harbour, Florida - demolished
 Loews Don CeSar Hotel, St. Pete Beach, Florida, 2003 to 2017 - now The Don CeSar
 The Hotels Ambassador, Chicago, Illinois - The Ambassador East is now Ambassador Chicago Hotel, The Ambassador West is now The Ambassador Condominiums
 Loews Annapolis Hotel, Annapolis, Maryland, until 2018 - now Graduate Annapolis 
 Loews Boston Hotel, Boston, Massachusetts - now Hotel AKA Back Bay
 Loews Lake Las Vegas Resort, Henderson, Nevada, 2006 to 2012 - now Westin Lake Las Vegas
 The Traymore, Atlantic City, New Jersey - demolished
 Loews Glenpointe Hotel, Teaneck, New Jersey - now Teaneck Marriott at Glenpointe
 Loew's Midtown Motor Inn - now Hilton Garden Inn Times Square
 City Squire Motor Inn - now The Manhattan at Times Square Hotel
 Howard Johnson's Motor Lodge - now Hampton Inn Manhattan-Times Square North
 Loews Summit Hotel, New York - now DoubleTree Metropolitan Hotel
 The Drake, New York, New York - demolished
 The Warwick, New York, New York - now Warwick New York Hotel
 Americana of New York, New York, New York - now Sheraton New York Times Square Hotel
 Loews Anatole Hotel, Dallas, Texas, 1979 to 1995 - now Hilton Anatole
 Loews Hotel 1000 Seattle, Seattle, Washington - now Hotel 1000, LXR Hotels & Resorts

Canada
 Loews Westbury Hotel, Toronto, Ontario, Canada - now Courtyard by Marriott Toronto Downtown
 Hôtel Loews La Cité, Montreal, Quebec, Canada - now New Residence Hall, McGill University
 Hôtel Loews Vogue, Montreal, Quebec, Canada - now Curio By Hilton (first Curio in Canada),
 Loews Le Concorde, Quebec City, Quebec, Canada, 1970-2014 - now Hôtel Le Concorde Québec

Caribbean
 Loews Paradise Island Hotel & Villas, Paradise Island, Bahamas - now Atlantis Paradise Island
 Loews Harbour Cove, Paradise Island, Bahamas - now Warwick Paradise Island
 Loews Dominicana, Santo Domingo, Dominican Republic - now Dominican Fiesta Hotel Santo Domingo
 Americana of San Juan, San Juan, Puerto Rico - now Royal Sonesta San Juan

Europe
 Loews Biarritz Le Miramar, Biarritz, France - now Sofitel Biarritz Le Miramar Thalassa
 Loews La Napoule Hotel & Casino, Mandelieu-la-Napoule, France - now Pullman Cannes Mandelieu Royal Casino Hotel
 Loews Athens, Athens, Greece
 Loews Monte Carlo, Monte Carlo, Monaco, 1975-1998 - now Fairmont Monte Carlo
 Loews Marbella Beach, Marbella, Spein
 Loews Marbella Golf, Marbella, Spain
 Loews Frankfurt Hotel, Frankfurt, West Germany - now Frankfurt Marriott Hotel
 Loews Hamburg Plaza Hotel, Hamburg, West Germany - now Radisson Blu Hotel Hamburg
 Loews Churchill Hotel, London, UK - now Hyatt Regency London - The Churchill
 The Montcalm Hotel, London, UK

References

External links
 Loews Hotels official website
 Loews Hotels Twitter
 Loews Hotels Facebook
 Loews Hotels YouTube
 Loews Hollywood Hotel

 
Hospitality companies of the United States
Hospitality management
American companies established in 1960
Hospitality companies established in 1960
Luxury brands
Companies based in New York City
Tisch family